Henri Collard (23 January 1912 – 23 February 1988) was a Belgian cyclist. He competed in the sprint event at the 1936 Summer Olympics.

References

External links
 

1912 births
1988 deaths
Belgian male cyclists
Olympic cyclists of Belgium
Cyclists at the 1936 Summer Olympics
Sportspeople from Liège
Cyclists from Liège Province